Rhododendron oreotrephes (山育杜鹃, shan yu du juan) is rhododendron species native to Burma and south-west China, collected in Sichuan in 1904 by Dr. Ernest Henry Wilson. Its flowers are pink to lavender. Fragrant leaves smell of warming spices with notes of cinnamon and pine.

References 

 "Rhododendron oreotrephes", W. W. Smith, Notes Roy. Bot. Gard. Edinburgh. 8: 201. 1914.
 eFloras entry
 Rhododendron.org entry
 Paghat's Garden entry
 Oregon State University entry

oreotrephes